The twelfth season of the police procedural drama NCIS premiered on September 23, 2014, in the same time slot as in the previous seasons, Tuesdays at 8 pm. This is the first season in which NCIS: Los Angeles did not air after NCIS. This season, NCIS: New Orleans aired after NCIS. The entire season eleven cast renewed their contracts and returned for the new season. The premiere episode aired on September 23, 2014 and was seen by 18.23 million people.

The main antagonist of the season is Sergei Mishnev, played by Alex Veadov. This character first appears in the premiere episode "Twenty Klicks". In episode four, "Choke Hold", one of Sergei's associates is sent to the United States to kill a Russian scientist who refused to work with him. Anton Pavlenko (previously seen in "Twenty Klicks"), portrayed by Lev Gorn, a Russian counselor, reappears in this episode. Veadov returns as Sergei in "Check" where he "gets personal" with Gibbs by killing Gibbs' ex-wife Diane in the same way that Caitlin Todd was killed, stalking Rebecca, another of Gibbs' ex-wives, and staging murders mimicking the deaths of Mike Franks and Jenny Shepard. Sergei returns again in "Cabin Fever", where he is killed by Tobias Fornell, who was also married to Diane at one point and who was dealing with intense grief and depression following Diane's murder. It is revealed that Sergei and Ari Haswari are half brothers from Ari's mother, whereas Ari and Ziva David were half brother and sister from their father, Eli David.

Cast

Main 
 Mark Harmon as Leroy Jethro Gibbs, NCIS Supervisory Special Agent (SSA) of the Major Case Response Team (MCRT) assigned to Washington's Navy Yard
 Michael Weatherly as Anthony DiNozzo, NCIS Senior Special Agent, second in command of MCRT
 Pauley Perrette as Abby Sciuto, Forensic Specialist for NCIS
 Sean Murray as Timothy McGee, NCIS Special Agent
 Brian Dietzen as Jimmy Palmer, Assistant Medical Examiner for NCIS
 Emily Wickersham as Eleanor "Ellie" Bishop, NCIS Probationary Special Agent
 Rocky Carroll as Leon Vance, NCIS Director
 David McCallum as Dr. Donald "Ducky" Mallard, Chief Medical Examiner for NCIS

Recurring 
 Alan Dale as Thomas Morrow, Homeland Security Section Chief and former NCIS Director
 Joe Spano as Tobias Fornell, FBI Senior Special Agent
 Adam Campbell as young Donald Mallard 
 Salli Richardson-Whitfield as Carrie Clark, former FBI Special Agent, turned criminal attorney
 Susanna Thompson as Hollis Mann, DoD Special Agent, Gibbs' former girlfriend and former Army CID Agent
 Robert Wagner as Anthony Di Nozzo, Sr., Tony's father
 Michelle Pierce as Breena Palmer, Jimmy Palmer's wife
 Tamer Hassan as Agah Bayar, NCIS target
 Diane Neal as Abigail Borin, CGIS Special Agent in Charge
 Kiara Muhammad as Kayla Vance, Leon Vance's daughter
 Melinda McGraw as Diane Sterling, IRS Special Agent and Gibbs' and Fornell's ex-wife
 Matt L. Jones as Ned Dorneget, NCIS Special Agent, Cyber Division
 Leslie Hope as Sarah Porter, Secretary of the Navy
 Margo Harshman as Delilah Fielding, DoD Computer Specialist and McGee's girlfriend
 Juliette Angelo as Emily Fornell, Tobias Fornell's daughter
 Jamie Bamber as Jake Malloy, NSA Attorney and Bishop's husband
 Kent Shocknek as Guy Ross, ZNN news anchor
 Tony Gonzalez as Tony Francis, NCIS Special Agent
 Marisol Nichols as Zoe Keates, ATF Special Agent and DiNozzo's girlfriend
 Rafi Silver as Qasim Naasir, a translator who worked with NCIS
 Mimi Rogers as Joanna Teague, CIA Agent and Ned Dorneget's mother
 Alex Veadov as Sergei Mishnev, NCIS target

Guest appearances 
 Sasha Alexander as Caitlin Todd, deceased NCIS Special Agent who was killed by Ari Haswari
 Jessica Steen as Paula Cassidy, deceased NCIS Senior Special Agent
 Tim Kelleher as Chris Pacci, deceased NCIS Special Agent
 Lauren Holly as Jenny Shepard, deceased NCIS Director
 Muse Watson as Mike Franks, deceased retired Senior Special Agent for NCIS and Gibbs' former boss
 Jeri Ryan as Rebecca Chase, Gibbs third wife and ex-wife #2
 Millie Bobby Brown as Rachel Barnes

Production 

On March 13, 2014, CBS renewed NCIS for this season. On June 11, 2014, at the Cannes Film Festival, NCIS was cited as being the most-watched drama in the world, with 57.6 million viewers worldwide. Gary Glasberg, the executive producer of the show, said, "As NCIS enters its 12th season, we couldn't be happier to learn we're now the #1 drama in the world. It's no secret that determination and teamwork have allowed our cast and crew to continue to deliver a show we're truly proud of. We also know we wouldn’t be here without the support and loyalty of the best fans in television. Thanks to our worldwide audience for helping us start the new season off right." In the first half of July 2014, the cast was given the script for the premiere episode, "Twenty Klicks". Filming began on this episode in the last week of July.

Episodes

Ratings

International broadcast 
The season airs simultaneously on Global in Canada. It began airing on September 30, 2014 on Network Ten in Australia. In the United Kingdom and Ireland, it premiered on January 9, 2015 on Fox.

References 

General

External links 

 

2014 American television seasons
2015 American television seasons
NCIS 12